NGC 913 is a lenticular galaxy located in the constellation Andromeda about 224 million light years from the Milky Way. It was discovered by French astronomer Édouard Stephan in 1878.

See also 
 List of NGC objects (1–1000)

References

External links 
 

Lenticular galaxies
Andromeda (constellation)
0913
009230